was a Japanese samurai of the Azuchi-Momoyama period, who served the Tokugawa clan.

Fudai daimyo
Samurai
1547 births
1612 deaths
Honda clan